Karen Bausman (born February 8, 1958, in Allentown, Pennsylvania) is an American architect. Bausman is the Eliot Noyes Chair at the Graduate School of Design, Harvard University, and the Eero Saarinen Chair at Yale School of Architecture, Yale University, the only American woman to hold both design chairs.

She is principal of Karen Bausman + Associates, a New York City-based architecture firm founded in 1995.

Early life and education
Karen Bausman was born February 8, 1958, in Allentown, Pennsylvania. The earliest and most lasting influence on her expanding thoughts about art and architecture, according to Bausman, was John Hejduk, Cooper Union's dean who revolutionized architectural education in the United States and encouraged independent research. Her thesis project, One-Way Bridge, was featured in Education of an Architect, published by Rizzoli International Publications in 1988.

Architectural works
Bausman's study of nature's sustainable structures, a bird's nest, for example and her research into biological composite systems, such as the surface and structure of a rose bloom, underlie her  building designs. Suggesting unfolding flower petals, Performance Theater, which was designed as a hybrid performance venue for Warner Bros. in Los Angeles, replaces a bleak parking lot in the center of its Burbank campus with flexible stage and amphitheater spaces for use by the entertainment community. "It springs from the ground in a way that is expressive of the expansive new ideas embodied by the company's roster of performing artists," she said when accepting the progressive architecture award for the theater's design.

This commission and other works that push the boundaries of structural and visual poetry formed the basis of Karen Bausman: Supermodels, a solo exhibition of her building designs and working methods at Harvard University in 2001.

Bausman was a faculty member of Columbia University's School of Architecture's Advanced Architectural Design Studio (AAD) from 1990 to 2004 as the design studio was radically altered by digital visualization, the introduction of new materials, and the integration of digital with analog production. Her applied research into biological and other natural structures, together with computational design techniques she developed are featured in INDEX Architecture, a Columbia GSAPP book published by MIT Press in 2003.

In 1994, Bausman was awarded the Rome Prize at a White House ceremony. She was awarded the Cooper Union Citation for Outstanding Contributions to the Field of Architecture in that same year. In 1995 she was elected a Fellow of the American Academy in Rome. She also was the subject of a New York Times profile in 2005 after her firm was awarded a multiyear design and construction excellence contract as part of New York City Mayor Michael R. Bloomberg’s initiative to bring new ideas and technologies to the design of city-financed libraries, community centers, and other structures in New York City. Among Bausman's interior design projects are award-winning New York headquarters for her private clients Warner Bros. and Elektra Entertainment Group. She has also built numerous private residences.

Bausman lectures on her work and on architecture at universities nationwide and as a television commentator, most recently on Secrets of New York's The Towers of Gotham episode on PBS stations.

Awards and honors
 Elliot Noyes Chair, Harvard Graduate School of Design, 2001
 Progressive Architecture Award for Design Excellence, 1998
 Rome Prize, American Academy in Rome, 1994
 Eero Saarinen Chair, Yale School of Architecture, Yale University, 1994
 Cooper Union Citation for Outstanding Contributions to the Field of Architecture, 1994
 Emerging Voices, Architectural League of New York, 1992
 New York Foundation for the Arts fellowship, 1988, 1996

Major building designs
 Performance Theater for Warner Bros., Los Angeles (P/A Award 1998)
 Hamlin Chapel and Library (Architecture'' awards issue)
 Korean Memorial and Cultural Center (Karen Bausman: "Supermodels" Exhibit, Harvard Graduate School of Design
 Flower Tower

References

External links
 Karen Bausman + Associates

1958 births
Living people
20th-century American architects
21st-century American architects
21st-century American women
American women architects
Artists from Allentown, Pennsylvania
Cooper Union alumni
Columbia University faculty
Educators from Allentown, Pennsylvania
Harvard Graduate School of Design faculty
Yale School of Architecture faculty